Bishop Luffa School, named after a former Bishop of Chichester, Ralph de Luffa, is a co-educational Church of England secondary school located in Chichester, West Sussex, England. The number of enrolled pupils was around 1,400 in 2010, in eight 'Year' house-forms and the sixth form. The school, formerly a 'Technology College', is now a 'CofE Teaching School', holding Leading Edge status, with national Artsmark and Sportsmark also having been awarded. From its foundation to 2013 the school was a Voluntary Aided establishment, on 1 December 2013 the school successfully converted to Academy status.

New classrooms 
The school applied for planning permission for a drama studio to form the start of a new £2.5m creative arts centre for the school. The planning application was approved and the school started construction in August 2006. The drama studio was opened in February 2007. The school has also extended their sports hall, adding an extension onto the original facility, where the climbing wall is now kept. At the end of 2017, over 18 months of work was completed to remodel the former 'K Block', at the southern end of the buildings – forming a newly updated Humanities Block, with additional and remodelled facilities. At the same time, the Main Reception of the school was repositioned into the centre of this new facility, from the Northern site entrance – which also had the effect of amending the postal address of the school – which now (for postal purposes) is located on Westgate (from Bishop Luffa Close).

Sixth form
There is an integral sixth form at Bishop Luffa for students who wish to continue their education after the age of sixteen, with an annual intake of around 160. Although 140 existing pupils are given priority, 20 pupils from other schools are also accepted each year for entry in Year 12. A wide range of subjects can be studied, including Business Studies, Computing, Law and Economics. The school also offers the new AQA Baccalaureate 'Bacc' hybrid qualification, including a 100-hour self-directed project.

A2 level pass rates at Bishop Luffa are above the national average. In 2017, for co-educational State schools in West Sussex, Bishop Luffa pupils achieved the 3rd highest average individual point scores (11th overall).

Academic performance
The school's admission policy is non-academically selective. In 2017, amongst co-educational State Secondaries, the school was rated the highest in West Sussex (4th overall) against the new 'Attainment 8' Key GCSE subject scores per pupil, including English, Maths, Sciences and Humanities.

The (Oct 2008 and November/December 2022) Ofsted reports rated the school as uniformly "outstanding" across all metrics.

In 2008 the school was praised by the Anglican schools inspectorate for its Christian religious character and met minimum standards.

Houses
Years 7 – 11 are split into 8 house groups, each named after former Bishops of Chichester:

Andrewes – Green, Burrows – Blue, King – Pink, Otter – Purple, Ridgeway – Red, Sherborne – Black, Story – White and Wilson – Yellow.

Andrewes was previously Bell which was changed in 2016 due to the fall of Bishop George Bell's reputation.

Notable former pupils 

 Jonathan Ansell, musician, pop-opera band G4
 Samuel Preston, singer, the Ordinary Boys and Celebrity Big Brother 
 Alex Preston, novelist and journalist
 Charlotte Hawkins, television and radio presenter
 Linus Roache, actor, son of William Roache of Coronation Street, Batman Begins and Law & Order 
 Rupert Holliday-Evans, actor, The Bill
 Cara Horgan, actress, Lewis (TV series) and Silent Witness
 Dame Helena Morrissey, (born 1966), financier
 Stuart Matthew Price, singer, composer and theatrical producer
 Joel Ward, footballer,  Crystal Palace Football Club
 Rupert Wingfield-Hayes, BBC foreign correspondent
 Jess Breach, England Womens Rugby team
 Sarah Bern, England Womens Rugby team

References

External links 
 School website
 EduBase

Education in Chichester
Secondary schools in West Sussex
Educational institutions established in 1963
Church of England secondary schools in the Diocese of Chichester
1963 establishments in England
Academies in West Sussex